Lewinella is a Gram-negative, chemoorganotrophic and aerobic genus from the family Lewinellaceae.

References

Further reading 
 
 
 
 
 

Bacteroidota
Bacteria genera